Bălți County may refer to:
 Bălți County (Moldova)
 Bălți County (Romania)